Louis Curtis (born March 14, 1955) is an American boxer. He competed in the men's light flyweight event at the 1976 Summer Olympics. At the 1976 Summer Olympics, he lost to Henryk Średnicki of Poland.

References

1955 births
Living people
Light-flyweight boxers
American male boxers
Olympic boxers of the United States
Boxers at the 1976 Summer Olympics
Boxers from Washington, D.C.